Tricheurois is a genus of moths of the family Noctuidae.

Species
 Tricheurois nigrocuprea (Moore, 1867)

References

Tricheurois at funet

Noctuinae